Kenneth Laufman (born January 30, 1932) is a Canadian ice hockey centre who competed in the 1956 Winter Olympics and 1960 Winter Olympics.

Born in Hamilton, Ontario, Laufman was a member of the Kitchener-Waterloo Dutchmen who won the bronze medal for Canada in ice hockey at the 1956 Winter Olympics and the silver medal for Canada in ice hockey at the 1960 Winter Olympics.

He played for the Guelph Biltmores, Halifax Atlantics, Johnstown Jets, Portland Buckaroos. Laufman played 54 matches in the Ontario Hockey Association, 132 matches in the Eastern Hockey League and 83 matches in the Western Hockey League.

References

External links

 sports-reference

1932 births
Canadian ice hockey centres
Ice hockey people from Ontario
Ice hockey players at the 1956 Winter Olympics
Ice hockey players at the 1960 Winter Olympics
Johnstown Jets players
Living people
Olympic bronze medalists for Canada
Olympic ice hockey players of Canada
Olympic silver medalists for Canada
Cincinnati Wings players
Olympic medalists in ice hockey
Medalists at the 1956 Winter Olympics
Medalists at the 1960 Winter Olympics
Portland Buckaroos players
Sportspeople from Hamilton, Ontario
Canadian expatriate ice hockey players in the United States